Dracula minax is an epiphytic species of orchid found in Colombia. Its flowers have a 5 cm diameter.

References 

minax